The 1929 San Diego mayoral election was held on March 19, 1929 to elect the mayor for San Diego. Incumbent mayor Harry C. Clark stood for reelection to a second term. In the primary election Clark received a majority of the votes and was elected outright with no need for a contested runoff.

Candidates
Harry C. Clark, Mayor of San Diego
Patrick F. O'Rourke
Ozro D. Thomas
Ella S. Robbins
William I. Kinsley

Campaign
Incumbent Mayor Harry C. Clark stood for reelection to a second term. On March 19, 1929, Clark received a majority of 58.9 percent of the vote in the primary election. This was more than 30 percent higher than what was received by Patrick O'Rourke, his nearest competitor. Clark received 99.8 percent of the vote in the uncontested runoff on April 2, 1929 and was elected to the office of the mayor.

Primary Election results

General Election results
Because Clark won outright in the primary with a majority of the vote, his was the only eligible name on the runoff ballot.

References

1929
1929 California elections
1929
1929 United States mayoral elections
March 1929 events in the United States